Johnny Bravo is an American animated comedy television series created by Van Partible for Cartoon Network and distributed by Warner Bros. Domestic Television Distribution. It is the second of the network's Cartoon Cartoons, which aired from July 14, 1997, to August 27, 2004. The titular Johnny Bravo (voiced by Jeff Bennett), who is loosely based on Elvis Presley and James Dean, is a sunglasses-wearing, muscular young man who lives with his mother and attempts to get women to date him, though he always falls short because of his actions. He ends up in bizarre situations and predicaments, often accompanied by celebrity guest characters such as Donny Osmond or Adam West. Throughout its run, the show was known for its adult humor and pop culture references.

Partible pitched the series to Hanna-Barbera's animation showcase What a Cartoon!, basing it on his senior thesis project he produced while attending Loyola Marymount University. A pilot short aired on Cartoon Network in 1995. The series was renewed for a second season in 1999, during which Partible left, and the show was retooled under the direction of Kirk Tingblad. In 2003, for the series' fourth season, Partible returned and restored the show to its original format and style. In its four seasons, a total of 67 episodes have aired. The first three seasons were produced by Hanna-Barbera Cartoons, while the fourth season was produced by Cartoon Network Studios.

Johnny Bravo was nominated for four Annie Awards, one YoungStar Award, and two Golden Reel Awards. The series helped launch the careers of several animators, including Seth MacFarlane and Butch Hartman. Spin-off media include comic books, DVD and VHS releases, collectible toys, T-shirts with Johnny's well known phrase "Yooo Mama", and video games.

Premise 
The series centers on Johnny Bravo (voiced by Jeff Bennett), a sunglasses-wearing, muscular, conceited narcissist and dimwitted self-proclaimed womanizer with a pompadour and an Elvis Presley-esque voice, apparently of Italian heritage, who lives in Aron City (a nod to Presley's middle name). Episodes typically revolve around him trying to get a woman to go on a date with him, though his advances are usually rejected and result in the woman in question harming him in a comedic way due to his boorish manner. Johnny's companions are Bunny "Momma" Bravo (Brenda Vaccaro), his lively, caring, extroverted, equally dimwitted mother, who also wears sunglasses; Little Suzy (Mae Whitman), a talkative and intelligent little girl from the neighborhood who likes to annoy Johnny, although he rarely remembers her name; Carl Chryniszzswics (Tom Kenny), a geek who idolizes Johnny despite being bullied and bossed around by him; and Pops (Larry Drake), the unscrupulous owner of the local diner who provides advice to Johnny, along with food made from atypical ingredients.

Recurring characters include Master Hamma (Brian Tochi), a Japanese martial arts instructor who teaches Johnny but never considers him a student due to being the weakest and most pathetic student in the dojo; Donny Osmond (himself), a cheery and optimistic teen idol who irritates Johnny; and Jungle Boy (Cody Dorkin), a jungle-dwelling feral child with super strength and the ability to speak to animals.

Much of the series' humor is derived from celebrity guest star appearances and references to popular culture. For example, an episode in season 1 is based around homages to The Twilight Zone, and in another episode, one of the Village People can be seen in the background. The series has had numerous guest stars, including Adam West, Shaquille O'Neal, Seth Green and the aforementioned Donny Osmond. In the first season, creator Van Partible intended for the show's middle segment to be a form of "Johnny Bravo Meets...", a parody of The New Scooby-Doo Movies, which would feature appearances from popular 1970s icons, but guest stars were used informally after the second season began. Many Hanna-Barbera characters had cameo appearances in the series, including the cast of Scooby-Doo, Speed Buggy, Jabberjaw, Fred Flintstone, Yogi Bear, The Blue Falcon, Black Widow, and Huckleberry Hound.

Adult humor is a frequent presence. In one episode, when Suzy calls Johnny to ask if he wants to come over, Johnny nonchalantly tells her to "[call] back in 15 years when [she is] a co-ed.", and in another, when Johnny is hit by a tranquilizer dart and is informed he has only "6 seconds of consciousness left" and to "use it wisely", he immediately pulls out a Girlie Magazine.

In regard to the adult humor, Hartman stated "...being concerned with the content of the episodes wasn't our main focus", and creator Partible remembers that "No one was really watching Cartoon Network [...] As far as content, they were pretty lenient on all the kind of things that were going on."

Production

Development 
While attending Loyola Marymount University, Van Partible produced his senior thesis project Mess O' Blues (1993), an animated short film about an Elvis Presley impersonator. Partible's animation professor showed the film to a friend who worked for Hanna-Barbera, and the studio loved the film. They asked Partible to develop it into a pitch for a seven-minute short, prompting him to sell the project to Hanna-Barbera.

For the new short, Partible revised his main character from Mess O' Blues, renaming him "Johnny Bravo" and making him "this '50s iconic James Dean-looking character that talked like Elvis." He was also inspired by Michael Jackson's "impetus for using whip snaps and cracks" (like in Captain EO) for whenever Johnny striked a pose. Voice actor Jeff Bennett was cast as Johnny, based solely on his young, hyped Elvis impression. Partible, with a small team of animators, animated the short themselves in-house at Hanna-Barbera using digital ink and paint.

The short, titled Johnny Bravo, was aired on Cartoon Network's animation showcase, World Premiere Toons, on March 26, 1995. Two more shorts followed: Jungle Boy in "Mr. Monkeyman" in 1996 and Johnny Bravo and the Amazon Women in 1997.

The name Johnny Bravo derived from creator Van Partible's middle name, Giovanni Bravo, as Giovanni is an Italian name for John or Johnny, or possibly from an alias given to Greg Brady in The Brady Bunch episode "Adios Johnny Bravo". His movements are entirely based on Michael Jackson and the Happy Days character Arthur Fonzerelli. Johnny's personality is also similar to Gaston from Disney's Beauty and the Beast.

Original seasons 
The popularity of the shorts led to Cartoon Network commissioning a first season of Johnny Bravo, consisting of 13 episodes. The crew of the first season consisted of several writers, animators, and directors from World Premiere Toons, including Seth MacFarlane, Butch Hartman, Steve Marmel, and John McIntyre. Veteran animator Joseph Barbera also served as a creative consultant and mentor for the first season. Partible stated in a 1997 interview the goal of the series was to have "animation reminiscent of the old Hanna-Barbera cartoons".

It was Hanna-Barbera's first production after Turner Broadcasting System was purchased by Time Warner.

Johnny Bravo premiered on July 14, 1997, and the first season completed production in December of that year.

Retool seasons
After the first season, Johnny Bravo was put on hiatus, until it was picked up for an unexpected second season in 1999. Van Partible was fired during Warner Bros. takeover of Turner Broadcasting and Kirk Tingblad took over as director, leading to a major retooling in the show's visual style, tone, humor, and characters. The show retained this format for the third season.

The series was put on hiatus once again until it was renewed for a fourth season in 2003, which aired in 2004. The final season of the series returned to the humor of the original shorts and first season of the series, with Van Partible returning and co-directing all of the fourth season episodes, although the Jungle Boy character from the first season never returned.

Episodes

Reception and legacy 
In 2009, IGN ranked Johnny Bravo No. 71 for its Top 100 Animated Series list.

After the series ended in 2004, the No. 5 Kellogg's Chevrolet was given a special paint scheme with Johnny Bravo on the hood. It was driven by Kyle Busch in the 2005 Sharpie 500 NASCAR race.

On the long lasting impact of the show, writer/director Butch Hartman states:

The title character is considered "iconic", and his catchphrases are relatively common in popular culture.

The show's creative team went on to create many successful television series throughout the 1990s and 2000s, including writer Seth MacFarlane, creator of the popular animated series Family Guy. Shortly after the series' first season was completed, writer/director Butch Hartman left to work on Nickelodeon's Oh Yeah! Cartoons, from which those shorts spun off his own success, The Fairly OddParents. Steve Marmel, writer for Johnny Bravo, has been a producer and writer for The Fairly OddParents since its premiere in 2001. In addition to Johnny Bravo, director John McIntyre directed episodes of several other Cartoon Cartoons, and more recently served as a supervising director on Cartoon Network's original series The Marvelous Misadventures of Flapjack.

Awards and nominations

Spin-offs

JBVO: Your All Request Cartoon Show 
JBVO: Your All Request Cartoon Show was a programming block that aired Sundays on Cartoon Network from April 2, 2000, to mid-2001. It was hosted by Johnny Bravo, along with some infrequent guest stars such as Chicken (from Cow and Chicken). Callers would write into the show via mail or through the Cartoon Network website to call the show and request a cartoon from Cartoon Network's cartoon library, which would then be played, with an exception of half-hour-long shows. One caller of the show named Jennifer requested an episode of Dragon Ball Z. Being that it was a half-hour long, Johnny regretfully had to fast-forward through the entire episode with Johnny providing only expositional commentary. Afterward, Johnny apologized to the caller for the inconvenience.

After the series ended, a spin-off of JBVO named Toon FM was launched in Europe. The series had a few unique changes, such as Godzilla presenting the weather. The spin-off also had Brak from Space Ghost as the co-host.

There was also a similar spin-off of the JBVO concept itself entitled Viva Las Bravo, a summer block that aired from 2005 to 2006 on certain European variants of Cartoon Network. Every day Johnny would announce three cartoons, and the one getting the highest votes via email or on CartoonNetworkHQ.net would be shown for two hours the next day. He would also constantly appear in commercial breaks, cracking jokes or answering humorous emails and phone calls.

Media

Comics 
Johnny Bravo first appeared in the Cartoon Network Starring series from DC Comics from 1999 to 2001. Newer stories were then included for Cartoon Network's Cartoon Cartoons anthology comic from DC comics from 2001 to 2004. As well as the comics successor, Cartoon Network Block Party, from 2004 to 2009. In February 2013, IDW Publishing announced a partnership with Cartoon Network to produce comics based on its publishing properties. Johnny Bravo was one of these titles announced to be published.

Video games 
A video game titled Johnny Bravo in The Hukka Mega Mighty Ultra Extreme Date-O-Rama! was released on June 9, 2009, for the Nintendo DS and PlayStation 2. The PlayStation 2 version was released exclusively in Europe and Australia by Blast Entertainment, while the DS version was released in North America by MumboJumbo.

Characters from Johnny Bravo are featured in the Cartoon Network games Cartoon Network: Block Party, Cartoon Network Racing, Cartoon Network Speedway, Cartoon Network Universe: FusionFall, and Cartoon Network: Punch Time Explosion.

Planned film 
In October 2002, Variety reported that Warner Bros. had secured the film rights to make a live-action Johnny Bravo feature-length film "as a potential starring vehicle" for Dwayne "The Rock" Johnson. However, no further developments regarding this project have been announced since then.

Home media 
Warner Bros. stated in an interview that they were "...in conversations with Cartoon Network" for DVD collections of various cartoons, among which was Johnny Bravo in 2006. Johnny Bravo: Season 1, a two-disc set featuring the complete first season which contains all 13 episodes, was released by Madman Entertainment in Australia and New Zealand (Region 4) on October 10, 2007. On November 4, 2009, the complete second season was released. 

A Region 1 release of the first season, with different cover art and new special features, was released by Warner Home Video on June 15, 2010. The release is first in an official release of several Cartoon Cartoons on DVD, under the "Cartoon Network Hall of Fame" name.

All episodes of Johnny Bravo are available to download on the iTunes Store.

The PlayStation 2 version of the video game Cartoon Network Racing contains the episodes "Doommates" and "Johnny's Telethon" as unlockable extras.

See also 
 List of works produced by Hanna-Barbera Productions

References 
Notes

Footnotes

External links 

  at Cartoon Network's Department of Cartoons
 
 at Cartoon Network
 
 
  (Archived from the original on October 21, 2016.)

 
1990s American animated television series
2000s American animated television series
1990s American sitcoms
2000s American sitcoms
1997 American television series debuts
2004 American television series endings
American animated sitcoms
American children's animated comedy television series
Cartoon Cartoons
Cartoon Network original programming
Television series by Hanna-Barbera
Television series by Cartoon Network Studios
American television series revived after cancellation
Narcissism in fiction
Television characters introduced in 1995
Crossover animated television series
English-language television shows
Narcissism in television
Television series about single parent families